KTSB-CD, virtual and UHF digital channel 35, is a low-powered, Class A UniMás-affiliated television station licensed to Santa Maria, California, United States. Owned by Santa Monica-based Entravision Communications, it is a sister station to Santa Barbara-licensed Univision affiliate KPMR (channel 38). The two stations share studios on Fairway Drive in Santa Maria north of Santa Maria Public Airport; KTSB-CD's transmitter is located on Tepusquet Peak in Los Padres National Forest east of Santa Maria.

History

The Federal Communications Commission (FCC) granted a construction permit on September 28, 1995, to build a low-power television station on UHF channel 43 to serve Santa Barbara. Melissa Harnett was the originally owner of the station, which was given the callsign K43FA. Harnett licensed the station on July 10, 1997. In June 1998, following the allotment of channel 43 to Los Angeles independent station KCAL-TV for their digital facilities, Harnett attempted to move the station to a location about 15 mi (25 km) away, change the channel assignment to UHF 29 and to increase the power to the maximum 150 kW. The application would eventually be dismissed by the FCC. In October 1998, Harnett agreed to sell the station to JB Broadcasting Inc. The sale was approved by the FCC in April 1999 and consummated the following July. JB Broadcasting applied to upgrade the station's license to Class A and shortly after, agreed to sell the station to Univision Communications. The sale was approved in October 2001 and finalized in December and the station was granted a Class A license on October 9, 2002. About the same time, Univision agreed to sell the station to Entravision Communications and the deal was finalized in November 2002.

Subchannel

Programming
KTSB-CD features programs from the UniMás network, plus local and children's programming to fulfill its Class A license. A half-hour of news followed by a half-hour of other local programming, both from KPMR and aired three days a week, gives the station its necessary three hours weekly of locally produced programming. The UniMás network schedule features long blocks of movies, some of which are dubbed from English into Spanish.

References

External links 
Entravision official website

TSB-CD
UniMás network affiliates
Television channels and stations established in 1995
TSB-CD
1995 establishments in California
Former Univision Communications subsidiaries